Willem Canter (1542–1575) was a classical scholar from Utrecht. He edited the Eclogues of Stobaeus and the tragedies of Euripides, Sophocles and Aeschylus.

Canter studied under Jean Daurat in Paris before becoming an independent scholar in Louvain. His Ratio emendandi (Basle, 1566) was a guide to editing and textual criticism. He also translated the Sacred Tales of Aelius Aristides into Latin.

Works
 Novae Lectiones, 1564
 Ratio emendandi, 1566
 Evripidis Tragoediae XIX, 1571
 Sophoclis tragoediae VII, 1579

References

1542 births
1575 deaths
Dutch classical scholars
Scholars of ancient Greek literature